(born 3 March 1949) is a Japanese prelate of the Catholic Church. He has been Archbishop of Osaka since 2014. He was Bishop of Hiroshima from 2011 to 2014. Pope Francis elevated him to cardinal on 28 June 2018.

Biography
Thomas Aquino Manyo Maeda was born in Tsuwasaki, Kami-Goto, in the prefecture of Nagasaki on 3 March 1949. He studied at the Liceo Nanzan of Nagasaki and entered the Major Seminary Saint Sulpice in Fukuoka. He was ordained on 19 March 1975.

He was Secretary General of the Catholic Bishops' Conference of Japan from 2006 to 2011.

On 13 June 2011, Pope Benedict XVI appointed him Bishop of Hiroshima and he was consecrated a bishop on 23 September 2011. He participated in the peace movement in Hiroshima and campaigned for the beatification of those called "hidden Christians", 3,400 Nagasaki Christians—more than 600 died—exiled to scattered locations throughout Japan until the middle of the nineteenth century by the Japanese government.

On 20 August 2014, Pope Francis appointed him Archbishop of Osaka.

Since 2016 he has been Vice-President of the Japanese Episcopal Conference.

He writes haiku and incorporates them into his sermons.

Pope Francis made Manyo a cardinal on 28 June 2018, assigning him the titular church of Santa Pudenziana.

See also
 Cardinals created by Francis
 Catholic Church in Japan

References

External links

 
 Diocese of Osaka 

1949 births
Living people
People from Nagasaki
21st-century Roman Catholic archbishops in Japan
Japanese cardinals
Cardinals created by Pope Francis
Japanese Roman Catholic archbishops